Roberto Scarnecchia (born 20 June 1958) is an Italian association football manager and former player, who played as a midfielder.

Playing career
Scarnecchia played eight seasons (110 games, six goals) in Serie A for Roma, Napoli, Pisa and A.C. Milan.

Managerial career
In June 2012, Scarnecchia was appointed coach of Voghera in Serie D.

After football
Following his retirement, Scarnecchia pursued culinary studies in order to become a professional chef, and later opened a restaurant in Genoa, called MarinaPlace, and one in Rome called Undici ("Eleven," in Italian, a reference to his shirt number as a player, and the number of players that a team fields on the football pitch); he also completed a degree in economics and politics and wrote a book, L’uovo di Colombo, which was released in 2007.

References

1958 births
Living people
Footballers from Rome
Italian footballers
Association football midfielders
A.S. Roma players
S.S.C. Napoli players
Pisa S.C. players
A.C. Milan players
A.S.D. Barletta 1922 players
Serie A players
Serie C players
Serie B players
Italian football managers